Coleophora argentula is a moth of the family Coleophoridae, found in most of Europe, Russia and Asia Minor. The larvae live in cases and feed on the seeds of yarrow and sneezewort.

Description
The wingspan is 9.5–13 mm. The forewing is cream-coloured with distinct white longitudinal stripes and with oblique streaks and scattered fuscous scales. Certain identification requires examination of genitalia preparations. Adults are on wing in June and July.

Ovum
Eggs are laid on the flowers of yarrow (Achillea millefolium) and sneezewort (Achillea ptarmica).

Larva
The early instars feed from early September on the withering flowers and seeds. Early larvae feed in the seedheads which can be attached together with silk; often making a long gallery and a flimsy, silken case at one end. This case is initially white, but becomes brown when fully formed and reaches a length of about 5–6 mm.

Pupa
Pupation takes place within the case.

Gallery

Etymology
The genus Coleophora was raised by the German entomologist Jacob Hübner in 1822. The name refers to a sheath, i.e. to carry, from the portable case the larvae make. The moth was named argentula by the English entomologist James Francis Stephens in 1834, from a specimen found near London, England. The species name comes from argentum – the silver streaks along the veins on the forewing, which are in contrast to the ochreous ground colour.

References

External links
 Bestimmungshilfe für die in Europa nachgewiesenen Schmetterlingsarten

argentula
Moths described in 1834
Moths of Asia
Moths of Europe
Taxa named by James Francis Stephens